Ipswich Hospital is a large district general hospital in Heath Road, Ipswich, Suffolk, England. It is now managed by East Suffolk and North Essex NHS Foundation Trust which was formed on 1 July 2018 by the merging of Ipswich Hospital NHS Trust with Colchester Hospital University NHS Foundation Trust.

History
The hospital had its origins in the Ipswich Workhouse Infirmary, which was designed by Henry Percy Adams and built by George Grimwood & Son, and which opened in 1889. It became the Ipswich Borough General Hospital in 1939 and, after it had joined the National Health Service in 1948, it became the Ipswich Hospital, Heath Road Wing in 1955. After services transferred from the old Anglesea Road site in 1985, the hospital simply became known as Ipswich Hospital.

The hospital started implementing the Lorenzo patient record systems in December 2013. It became one of the partners in the Pathology Partnership established in March 2014 and started acting as one of two hubs for pathology in the region.

In 2022 the first part of its new  children's department opened. The project should be completed by summer 2024.

Performance

In November 2013 it was reported that the Ipswich Hospital NHS Trust had failed to meet a number of targets set by the Ipswich and East Suffolk Clinical Commissioning Group and faced financial penalties at a time when it already faced a deficit of £5.5 million.

In 2014 the trust was the fifth best in England on the target of seeing 95 per cent of people who attend accident and emergency departments within four hours; it achieved 96.6 percent, despite an 11 per cent increase in non-elective admissions. The trust has developed a tool that gives three hours' warning when the target is likely to be missed, based on factors such as acuity and intensive therapy unit bed numbers.

See also
 List of hospitals in England
 List of NHS trusts
 Healthcare in Suffolk
 List of tallest buildings and structures in Ipswich

References

External links

CQC inspection reports

Buildings and structures in Ipswich
Hospitals in Suffolk
1910 establishments in England
Hospitals established in 1889
NHS hospitals in England